The Basel Committee on Banking Supervision (BCBS) is a committee of banking supervisory authorities that was established by the central bank governors of the Group of Ten (G10) countries in 1974. The committee expanded its membership in 2009 and then again in 2014. As of 2019, the BCBS has 45 members from 28 jurisdictions, consisting of central banks and authorities with responsibility of banking regulation.

Overview
The committee provides a forum for regular cooperation on banking supervisory matters. Its objective is to enhance understanding of key supervisory issues and improve the quality of banking supervision worldwide. The committee frames guidelines and standards in different areas – some of the better known among them are the international standards on capital adequacy, the Core Principles for Effective Banking Supervision and the Concordat on cross-border banking supervision. The committee's Secretariat is located at the Bank for International Settlements (BIS) in Basel, Switzerland.  The BIS hosts and supports a number of international institutions engaged in standard setting and financial stability, one of which is BCBS. Yet like the other committees, BCBS has its own governance arrangements, reporting lines and agendas, guided by the central bank governors of the G10 countries.

Goals
Globalization in banking and financial markets was not accompanied by global regulation.  National regulators remained the most important actors in banking practices.  They had a capacity problem and an information problem. Therefore, the purpose of the BCBS is to encourage convergence toward common approaches and standards. The committee is not a classical multilateral organization, in part because it has no founding treaty. BCBS does not issue binding regulation; rather, it functions as an informal forum in which policy solutions and standards are developed.

The Basel Committee formulates broad supervisory standards and guidelines and recommends statements of best practice in banking supervision (see bank regulation or "Basel III Accord", for example) in the expectation that member authorities and other nations' authorities will take steps to implement them through their own national systems.

Organization
The Basel committee along with its sister organizations, the International Organization of Securities Commissions and International Association of Insurance Supervisors together make up the Joint Forum of international financial regulators.  However, the committee is not autonomous.  Although it has latitude, its work is reported to the central bank governors of the G10.  It cannot communicate conclusions, nor make proposals, to bodies outside the Bank for International Settlements without the general agreement and support of these governors.

From 2019 to 2022 the chairman of the committee was Pablo Hernández de Cos, Governor of the Bank of Spain. Neil Esho is the acting Secretary General of the Basel Committee.

In April 2022, Tiff Macklem, Governor of the Bank of Canada, took over as chairman of the committee.

Member countries
Currently, committee members come from Argentina, Australia, Belgium, Brazil, Canada, China, France, Germany, Hong Kong, India, Indonesia, Italy, Japan, Korea, Luxembourg, Mexico, the Netherlands, Russia, Saudi Arabia, Singapore, South Africa, Spain, Sweden, Switzerland, Turkey, the United Kingdom, and the United States. The committee's Secretariat is located at the Bank for International Settlements (BIS) in Basel, Switzerland. However, the BIS and the Basel Committee remain two distinct entities.

Until 2009, members included only developed countries: Belgium, Canada, France, Germany, Italy, Japan, Netherlands, Spain, Sweden, Switzerland, United Kingdom and the United States.

Groups

The committee is sub-divided into groups, each of which have specific task forces to work on specific issues:
The Standards Implementation Group (SIG)
Operational Risk Subgroup: addresses issues related to Advanced Measurement Approach for Operational Risk
Task Force on Colleges: develops guidance on the Basel Committee's work on supervisory colleges
Task Force on Remuneration: promotes the adoption of sound remuneration practices
Standards Monitoring Procedures Task Force: develops procedures to achieve greater effectiveness and consistency in standards monitoring and implementation
The Policy Development Group (PDG)
Risk Management and Modelling Group: point of contact with the industry on the latest advances in risk measurement and management
Research Task Force: facilitates economists from member institutions to discuss research on financial stability in consultation with the academic sector
Trading Book Group: reviews how risks in the trading book should be captured by regulatory capital
Working Group on Liquidity: works on global standards for liquidity risk management and regulation
Definition of Capital Subgroup: reviews eligible capital instruments
Capital Monitoring Group: co-ordinates the expertise of national supervisor in monitoring capital requirements
Cross-border Bank Resolution Group: compares the national policies, legal frameworks and the allocation of responsibilities for the resolution of banks with significant cross-border operations
The Accounting Experts Group (AEG): ensures that accounting and auditing standards help promote sound risk management thereby maintaining the safety and soundness of the banking system
Audit subgroup: explores key audit issues and co-ordinates with other bodies to promote standards
The Basel Consultative Group (BCG): facilitates engagement between banking supervisors including dialogue with non-member countries

Standards
The committee agrees on standards for bank capital, liquidity and funding. Those standards are non-binding high-level principles. Members are expected but not obliged to undertake effort to implement them e.g. through domestic regulation.

See also
Bank regulation
Basel Accords
BCBS 239
Joint Forum
Financial Stability Institute

References

External links
Basel Committee on Banking Supervision at the Bank for International Settlements website
http://bis2information.org: Practical articles, on BIS2 and risk modelling, submitted by professionals to help create an industry standard.

Bank regulation
Central banks
Committees
International finance institutions
Supranational banks
Organizations established in 1974
1974 establishments in Switzerland
1974 in economics